
The Llanganuco Lakes (Llankanuku in Quechua language), Chinancocha and Orconcocha, are situated in the Cordillera Blanca in the Andes of Peru. They are located in Ancash Region, Yungay Province, Yungay District, about 25 km north-east of Yungay. The lakes are part of Huascarán National Park.

Chinancocha 

It is situated southwest of Lake Orconcocha.

Orconcocha 
Lake Orconcocha (possibly from Quechua urqu male / mountain, "male lake") lies about 1 km away from Chinancocha at the end of the Llanganuco valley.

1970 Earthquake 
An extensive earthquake in 1970 caused an avalanche which created a third smaller lake between the two main lakes. Tragically a group of hikers camping between the two lakes were killed.

References

External links 

Lakes of Peru
Lakes of Ancash Region
Huascarán National Park